The Duluth Huskies are an amateur baseball team playing in the Northwoods League, a collegiate summer baseball league.  They have been operating in Duluth, Minnesota since 2003.  The Huskies play home games at Wade Stadium in Duluth, which was built in 1941.  The team plays 72 games throughout the summer, 36 home and 36 away.  The team mascot is Harley D. Huskie.  Huskies Games are streamed on Northwoods League TV.

Seasonal record

Huskies in professional baseball
Joe Bisenius, who pitched for Duluth in 2003, became the first Huskies player to appear in the Major Leagues, when he pitched for the Philadelphia Phillies on April 5, 2007, against the Atlanta Braves.

The following is a list of all Huskies players to appear in Major League Baseball as of the end of the 2016 season.

 Cody Asche, Huskies 2009–2010, Philadelphia Phillies, Chicago White Sox
 Aaron Barrett, Huskies 2008, Washington Nationals
 Joe Bisenius, Huskies 2003, Philadelphia Phillies, Washington Nationals
 Steve Edlefsen, Huskies 2004, San Francisco Giants
 Doug Mathis, Huskies 2004, Texas Rangers
 Mark Melancon, Huskies 2004, New York Yankees, Houston Astros, Boston Red Sox, Pittsburgh Pirates, Washington Nationals, San Francisco Giants
 Fernando Rodriguez, Huskies 2003, Los Angeles Angels of Anaheim, Houston Astros, Oakland Athletics
 Drew Smyly, Huskies 2009, Detroit Tigers, Tampa Bay Rays
 Zach Walters, Huskies 2009, Washington Nationals, Cleveland Indians, Los Angeles Dodgers

External links
 Duluth Huskies official site
 Northwoods League official site

Northwoods League teams
Duluth–Superior metropolitan area
Amateur baseball teams in Minnesota
Sports in Duluth, Minnesota